Yoo Sun-young (Korean 유선영 Yu Seon-Yeong ; born 13 December 1986), also known as Sun Young Yoo, is a South Korean female professional golfer who plays on the LPGA Tour. She won the 2012 Kraft Nabisco Championship, which was her first major championship.

Amateur career
Yoo had a distinguished amateur career. In 2001, she won the Korean Junior Golf Championship. She played on the Korean National Golf team in both 2002 and 2004. In 2004 Yoo won the Korean Amateur in addition to being a quarter-finalist at the U.S. Women's Amateur.

Professional career
Yoo turned professional in November 2004 and began playing the Futures Tour in 2005. Yoo won her first professional event, the Betty Puskar Golf Classic. That and ten top ten finishes in 18 events allowed Yoo to begin playing the LPGA Tour in 2006.

In September 2009 Yoo had her best ever finish on the LPGA Tour. At the end of 54 holes at the P&G Beauty NW Arkansas Championship, she was tied for first with Jiyai Shin and Angela Stanford. A sudden death playoff followed which was won on the second extra hole by Shin.

Yoo won her first LPGA Tour title at the 2010 Sybase Match Play Championship where she again faced Jiyai Shin and Angela Stanford on the way to the title. She defeated world number one Shin, in a semifinal match 2&1 and went on to defeat Stanford 3&1 in the championship match.

On 1 April 2012, Yoo won her first major title, the Kraft Nabisco Championship. I.K. Kim had a one-foot putt on the final hole for the win but missed it, resulted in a tie with Yoo and a sudden death playoff. On the first hole of the playoff, Yoo won with a 20-foot birdie putt.

Among her fellow South Koreans on the LPGA Tour, Yoo is known as 'Course Clown'.

Professional wins (3)

LPGA Tour wins (2)

LPGA Tour playoff record (1–2)

Futures Tour wins (1)

Major championships

Wins (1)

1 Defeated I.K. Kim in a sudden death playoff with birdie on first extra hole

Results timeline
Results not in chronological order before 2018.

^ The Evian Championship was added as a major in 2013

CUT = missed the half-way cut
WD = withdrew
T = tied

Summary

Most consecutive cuts made – 9 (2010 British Open – 2012 British Open)
Longest streak of top-10s – 2 (2011 British Open – 2012 Kraft Nabisco)

LPGA Tour career summary

 official as of 2018 season
*Includes matchplay and other events without a cut.

Futures Tour summary

Team appearances
Amateur
Espirito Santo Trophy (representing South Korea): 2004

References

External links

Profile at Yahoo! Sports 
Sun Young Yoo at SeoulSisters.com

South Korean female golfers
LPGA Tour golfers
Winners of LPGA major golf championships
Golfers from Seoul
Golfers from Orlando, Florida
1986 births
Living people